John Roland Seymour Phillips (born 1940) is a British historian and academic. He did a Doctor of Philosophy degree at the University of London in 1967, on the subject of the 14th-century Earl of Pembroke, Aymer de Valence. Later he published a book on the same subject. Phillips was head of the department of medieval history, at the University College Dublin. Today he is professor emeritus at that university. In 2010, Phillips contributed a volume on King Edward II to the Yale English Monarchs series.

References

Select publications

Academics of University College Dublin
Alumni of the University of London
British medievalists
Living people
Year of birth missing (living people)
1940 births